Yvonne Furneaux (born Elisabeth Yvonne Scatcherd; 11 May 1928) is a French-British retired actress. A graduate of the Royal Academy of Dramatic Art, she worked with notable filmmakers like Peter Brook, Federico Fellini, Roman Polanski, Michelangelo Antonioni, and Claude Chabrol, as well as in several genre productions.

Early life 
Furneaux was born Elisabeth Yvonne Scatcherd to English parents living in Roubaix, France. Her Yorkshireman father, Joseph Scatcherd, was a director at a local branch of Lloyds Bank. Her mother, Amy Furneaux, was from Devon. She had a sister, Jeanne.  

The family moved to England prior to the outbreak of World War II, and Yvonne enrolled in St Hilda's College, Oxford in 1946 to study Modern Languages, where she was known as "Tessa Scatcherd". While studying at Oxford she became involved in university theatre groups, and after graduating enrolled in the Royal Academy of Dramatic Art.

Career 
Furneaux made her stage debut at the age of 24. She played in productions of Macbeth and The Taming of the Shrew, and was photographed by Norman Parkinson as one of "The Young Look in the Theatre" for the January 1953 issue of Vogue.

She made her film debut with a minor role in Anthony Pelissier's omnibus comedy Meet Me Tonight (1952). She subsequently played several supporting parts, including in Peter Brook's 1953 film version of The Beggar's Opera, the adventure films The Master of Ballantrae and The Dark Avenger, and the mystery film The House of the Arrow. She played the female lead in the Hammer horror film The Mummy.

In 1955, she starred Michelangelo Antonioni's Le Amiche, which won the Silver Lion at the Venice Film Festival, and launched a successful parallel career in Italian cinema. She played Emma, the fiancée to Marcello Mastroianni's character, in Federico Fellini's La Dolce Vita. She played leading roles in several peplum films, and she returned to her native France to star in a pair of films for director Claude Autant-Lara (The Count of Monte Cristo and Enough Rope). 

In 1965, she played the sister of Catherine Deneuve's character in Roman Polanski's psychological thriller Repulsion.

Personal life
She was married to the cinematographer Jacques Natteau, who died on 17 April 2007. They had one son, Nicholas. Since 1985, she has resided in Lausanne, Switzerland.

Filmography

Film

Television

References

External links

 
 Yvonne Furneaux at aenigma

1928 births
Living people
20th-century British actresses
20th-century French actresses
Alumni of St Hilda's College, Oxford
British film actresses
British people of French descent
British expatriates in Switzerland
French film actresses
French expatriates in Switzerland
French expatriates in the United Kingdom
French emigrants to England
French people of English descent
People from Roubaix
RADA